Upendra Kumar Sinha is the former chairman of SEBI. His term started in February 2014. He has been appointed for a period of three years. He was  the Chairman and Managing Director (CMD) of the Unit Trust of India Asset Management Company (UTIAMC), commonly referred to as UTI Mutual Fund. He is a member of the Indian Administrative Services (IAS), belonging to the Bihar Cadre.

Biography 
He has drafted many acts and laws, although some of them never were passed. In 2002, Sinha drafted the SEBI amendment act. In 2004, he drafted the Securities Law Amendment Act, and the PFRDA Bill in 2005.

Since September 28, 2010, he has been chairman of the Association of Mutual Funds of India. Since February 2011, he has been the chairman of the Securities and Exchange Board of India.

Going Public 
He published an autobiography titled Going Public on January 5, 2020.

References

External links
Sinha's Profile at UTI
Unit Trust of India Company Website
UTI Turnaround Feature in Business Standard
Sinha's profile at Non Resident Bihari Blog

Living people
Bihar cadre civil servants
Indian Administrative Service officers
Indian diplomats
Businesspeople from Bihar
Year of birth missing (living people)
People from Gopalganj district, India